Commercially pure materials, usually metals, are ones that have been purified to a practical extent, sufficient for commercial purposes; that is, they are close to absolute/theoretical purity albeit with some low-but-nonzero tolerance for impurities (such as trace metals) that allows for their economically viable production cost.

Major examples include: 
 Commercially pure titanium: see Titanium § Commercially pure titanium
 Commercially pure zinc: see Zinc § Commercially pure zinc
 Commercially pure aluminium: see Aluminium § Applications